Alton is a market town and civil parish in the East Hampshire district of Hampshire, England, near the source of the River Wey. It had a population of 17,816 at the 2011 census.

Alton was recorded in the Domesday Survey of 1086 as Aoltone. During the Saxon period Alton was known as Aweltun. The Battle of Alton occurred in the town during the English Civil War. It also has connections with Sweet Fanny Adams and Jane Austen.

History

Early history

The Alton Hoard of Iron Age coins and jewellery found in the vicinity of the town in 1996 is now in the British Museum.
There is evidence of a Roman posting station at Neatham near Alton, probably called Vindomis, and a ford across the River Wey on the line of a Roman road that ran from Chichester to Silchester. An Anglo-Saxon settlement was established in the area and a 7th-century cemetery was discovered during building excavations. It contained grave goods including the Alton Buckle which is on display in the Curtis Museum and considered to be the finest piece of Anglo-Saxon craftsmanship found in Hampshire. The buckle, found in the grave of a warrior, has a silver-gilt body set with garnets and glass.

The River Wey has a source in the town, and the name Alton comes from an Anglo-Saxon word "aewielltun" meaning "farmstead at the source of the river".

In 1001 Danish forces invaded England and during the First Battle of Alton the forces of Wessex came together and fought against them. About 81 Englishman were killed, including Ethelwerd the King's high-steward, Leofric of Whitchurch, Leofwin the King's high-steward, Wulfhere a bishop's thane, and Godwin of Worthy, Bishop Elfsy's son. The Danes were the victors although Danish casualties were higher and fleeing Englishmen took refuge in Winchester.

Aoltone, in the 'Odingeton Hundred — Hantescire' is recorded as having the most valuable market in the Domesday Book.

The Treaty of Alton was signed in 1101 between William the Conqueror's eldest son Robert, Duke of Normandy and his brother Henry I of England. Henry had seized the throne while his elder brother was away on the first crusade. Robert returned to claim the throne, landing in Portsmouth. The brothers met in Alton and agreed terms which formed the Treaty of Alton. Part of the main street through Alton is called Normandy Street, probably reflecting this event.

Middle Ages
The first recorded market in Alton was in 1232, although the market at Neatham first recorded in the Domesday Book may also have been in the town. Blome wrote in 1673 of a 'market on Saturdays, which is very great for provisions, where also are sold good store of living cattle'. The Saturday market is featured on Kitchin's map of Hampshire (1751) which marks the town as Alton Mt. Sat.

1307 was, in fact, the first year of Edward II's reign but Edmund of Woodstock was not lord of the manor then. According to the Victoria County History (written after Curtis' book):-

As can be seen, Queen Margaret held the manor until 1317 and so the fair could not have been granted to Edmund of Woodstock in 1307.

The correct date for the grant seems to be 22 November 1320 (according to the Charter Rolls, 14 Edward II, no.15). The grant was for a 9-day fair – the vigil [eve] and feast of Whitsuntide and seven days after.

The two main manors in Alton – Alton Eastbrook and Alton Westbrook – had a fair each. That of Alton Eastbrook has no extant charter, and may never have had one. It was originally held on St Lawrence's Day and so its origin was, presumably, the patronal festival. The religious aspect would have ceased when the country was no longer Roman Catholic. This fair seems to have been held on Crown Close (which is in the manor of Alton Eastbrook) in the early 19th century. When this land was built upon, the fair moved and was held where ever the Westbrook fair was – the Market Place, various meadows and the Butts.

The date of the Eastbrook fair was changed to Michaelmas in the mid-18th century as it came during harvest time and the farmers were not satisfied. Some accounts for this fair in the early 18th century do survive and show that there was a cheese fair as well the usual mix of travelling and local people with stalls and stands – people selling lace, gloves, books, gingerbread, bodices, sugar plums, toys, soap and knives, to name but a few. By the late 19th century, this fair was said to be mainly for horses, sheep and, occasionally, hops. Alton still has an annual fair, but it now takes the form of a carnival.

Modern period
Eggar's School was founded in 1640 by John Eggar of Moungomeries as the Free Grammar School. It later became known as Eggar's Grammar School. It occupied a site in Anstey Road until it moved to a new site in Holybourne in 1969.

A battle was fought in Alton during the English Civil War. A small Royalist force was quartered in the town when on 13 December 1643 they were surprised by a Parliamentary army of around 5,000 men. The Royalist cavalry fled, leaving Sir Richard Bolle (or Boles) and his infantry to fight. Outnumbered, the Royalists were forced into the Church of St Lawrence, where Bolle was killed along with many of his men. Over 700 Royalist soldiers were captured and bullet holes from the battle are still visible in the church today.

In 1665, Alton suffered an outbreak of bubonic plague, but soon recovered.
On Saturday, 24 August 1867, an eight-year-old girl, Fanny Adams, was murdered in Alton. Her assailant, Frederick Baker, a local solicitor's clerk, was one of the last criminals to be executed in Winchester. Fanny Adams' grave can still be seen in Alton cemetery. The brutal murder, so the story goes, coincided with the introduction of tinned meat in the Royal Navy, and the sailors who did not like the new food said the tins contained the remains of "Sweet Fanny Adams" or "Sweet F.A." The expression "sweet fanny adams" has an old-fashioned slang meaning of nothing.

Governance

Prior to the Local Government Act 1972, Alton had fallen under the aegis of the (now defunct) Alton Urban District Council. The Act resulted in the dissolution of this body, and the establishment (on 1 April 1974) of the current Alton Town Council. The responsibilities of the Alton Urban District Council were divided between the new Alton Town Council, the Hampshire County Council and the newly formed East Hampshire District Council. The Council meets at Alton Town Hall, in Market Square.

Geography
Alton is between Farnham  to the northeast and Winchester  to the southwest.

Climate
Along with the rest of South East England, Alton has a temperate climate which is generally warmer than the rest of the country.

Economy

There have been a number of breweries in Alton since 1763. Coors Brewing Company (among the ten largest brewers in the world) had a brewery in Alton for fifty years, which produced Carling, Grolsch and Worthington. It closed in 2015 because it lost work from Heineken.

Alton was significant in the 18th century for the manufacture of paper and of dress materials including ribbed druggets, shallons,  silks and serges, bombazine and figured barragons.

Alton has businesses in the retail and service sectors in the centre of the town, and over a hundred businesses in the four industrial areas of Mill Lane, Newman Lane, Caker Stream and Omega Park, ranging from light industrial to computer software production.
Clarcor, TNT N.V. and Poseidon Diving Systems all have businesses in Alton's Industrial Site, Mill Lane.

One of Alton's largest commercial employers is the financial services sector. Lumbry Park, which used to be known as Lumbry Farm, is on the B3006 Alton to Selborne road, and is occupied by Inter Group Insurance Services (IGIS), a subsidiary of The Royal Bank of Scotland. Inter Group employs over 170 people on this site, and specialises in travel insurance. The company has operated in Alton since 1999. It was acquired by Churchill Insurance in 2001, becoming part of RBS Insurance division in 2003 as part of an RBS takeover. However, on 11 November 2008, Inter Group announced its proposal to close its office in Alton in August 2009 due to "changes in the travel insurance market", leading to the loss of 104 full-time staff and around 16 part-timers. The head of Inter Group, Bob Andrews, said that the decision to close the Alton site had been forced by "a fundamental shift in the third-party travel insurance market in the last few years" and that "Major clients of Inter Group have recently taken their travel insurance business back in-house and sadly we have no alternative but to make this announcement today". He said, "We have explored every possible avenue before proposing this unfortunate action."

Alton has a range of chain stores and independent shops including greengrocers, butchers and a hardware shop. There are five main supermarkets that serve the town.

Culture
Jane Austen Regency Week is a celebration of the time the author Jane Austen spent in Alton and Chawton and is held in June each year.

The Allen Gallery serves as Alton's art gallery. It houses a large, permanent ceramics collection as well as temporary exhibitions.

Holybourne Theatre is on the site of a former Nissen hut that was converted into a theatre by German prisoners-of-war during World War II. Plays have been performed there since 1950, but the official opening was not until 1971.

Alton Morris was formed in 1979, and have been Morris Dancing both in the United Kingdom and abroad. They often perform at Alton street events.

Local choirs include Alton Amateur Operatic and Dramatic Society, established in 1921, who perform two musical shows and one play each year in a wide variety of musical and dramatic styles. Alton Community Choir sings unaccompanied Hampshire folk songs as well as some African, gospel, blues and calypso music.

Notable landmarks

The Alton Independent Cinema Project was formed in May 2011 to help secure the future of independent cinema in the town.

Alton Maltings was renovated in 2004–2005 and is now the home of Harvest Church and is used by community groups, charities, private users and other organisations throughout the week. The Alton Maltings claims to be the widest wooden spanned building in Hampshire.

Alton Library was rebuilt in 2005 to a design by the County Council Architects. The new library contains a lending library, reference library, computer facilities and a cafe.<ref>Glancey, J. Sense and sensitivity: Alton's new library... The Guardian, 25 April 2005. Retrieved 27 October 2011.</ref>

Alton Sports Centre is open to the public and includes a swimming pool, gym, indoor and outdoor courts.

The Curtis Museum was founded in 1856 by Dr William Curtis and houses one of the finest local history collections in Hampshire.

The Town Gardens contains a bandstand (built in 1935 for the Silver Jubilee of King George V), a children's playground, flower beds, trees and shrubs. The bandstand was replaced in 2013 to commemorate Elizabeth II's Diamond Jubilee.

Anstey Park, is a large open space with playing fields and a small children's playground; the park is home to the town's rugby club.

Education

Alton lies approximately midway between the University of Winchester and the University of Surrey at Guildford but its nearest University campus is the University for the Creative Arts in Farnham. It is home to Treloar's, an independent educational establishment founded in 1907 by Sir William Purdie Treloar, Lord Mayor of London, to provide education for young people with physical disabilities. Treloar's now runs Treloar School and College, a provision of education for pupils aged from 2–25 with physical and learning difficulties in Holybourne. Treloar's provides specialist facilities, therapy and medical care to enable pupils to achieve their academic potential and develop their confidence and independence. Former pupils include comedian and actor Spike Breakwell, actress Julie Fernandez, mouth and foot painting artist Tom Yendell.

The State secondary schools in Alton are Eggar's School (formerly the Grammar School), and Amery Hill School. There is an independent Catholic day school, Alton School (formerly Alton Convent School), which educates boys and girls from 6 months to 18 years old. Sixth-form education is provided by Alton College, which has gained outstanding inspection reports from Ofsted.

Transport
Alton station is on the National Rail network at the end of the Alton line with a service to London Waterloo.

Alton railway station is the terminus for the Watercress Line, formerly the Mid Hants Railway, a restored steam railway running between Alton and New Alresford, so called because it used to be used to transport fresh watercress to London. The Watercress Line is now a charity largely operated by volunteers, and best known for its events such as Steam Illuminations, War on the Line and Day Out With Thomas featuring Thomas The Tank Engine.

The origins of the Watercress Line date back to 1861, the year in which Parliament granted consent for what was then known as the 'Alton, Alresford and Winchester Railway'. Four years later the Mid Hants Railway opened, and the train service continued until the line was closed in 1973. Then in 1977 the line was partially re-opened, in 1983 it was extended further, and in 1985 it was re-opened as far as Alton to connect with the mainline London service.

Alton used to be a railway junction. As well as the Mid-Hants Railway, from 1903 to 1955 the Meon Valley Railway ran from Alton down the Meon Valley to join the Eastleigh to Fareham line at Fareham. The Basingstoke and Alton Light Railway ran north to Basingstoke.

In 2015 some passenger buses in the Alton area were operated by Stagecoach South.

Notable people

 Adam de Gurdon (died 1305), son of a bailiff of Alton; English knight who rebelled against King Henry III, fought in single combat against the future King Edward I
 William de Alton (c. 1330 – 1400), Dominican Friar, writer and theological philosopher during King Edward II's reign, became famous for asserting that the Virgin Mary was polluted with original sin

 Edmund Spenser (1552–1599), the Elizabethan poet and contemporary of William Shakespeare, may have lived in a now well-preserved Tudor cottage at 1 Amery Street in about 1590. A plaque on the house states that he "lived some time in these parts".
 John Pitts, biographical author, born in Alton in 1560
 John Goodyer (1592–1664), botanist born in Alton
 John Murray (1741–1815), born in Alton, a pioneering minister of the Universalist church in the United States.
 William Curtis (1746–1799), botanist, was born in Alton and served his apprenticeship as an apothecary before devoting the rest of his life to the study of British plants.
 Jane Austen (1775–1817), Georgian novelist, lived in Chawton just outside Alton from 1809 until her death, and wrote or revised six novels there.
 Elijah Waring (1787–1857), Anglo-Welsh writer born in Alton, who founded an English-language periodical in Swansea, Wales
 James Winter Scott (1799–1873), British Whig politician who lived in Alton
 Cardinal Newman (1801–1890), English Catholic, lived in Alton from 1816 to 1819.
 Philip Crowley (1837–1900), English naturalist and entomologist specialising in Lepidoptera, born in Alton
 Alexander William Bickerton (1842–1929), professor of chemistry in New Zealand, born in Alton
 Arthur Romney Green (1872–1945), English craftsman and furniture designer born in Alton
 William Curtis Green (1875–1960), architect, designer and barrister born in Alton
 Dorothy Darnell (1876–1953), artist from Scotland, founder of the Jane Austen Society in Alton, died at home in Brook Cottage, Lenten Street, Alton
 Ernest George Horlock VC (1885–1917), born in Alton, English recipient of the Victoria Cross for gallantry in the First World War
 Malcolm Nokes (1897–1986), British schoolteacher, soldier, research scientist and Olympic athlete who died in Alton
 Lieutenant General Sir William Gregory Huddleston Pike KCB, CBE, DSO (1905–1993), senior British Army officer, Vice Chief of the Imperial General Staff, died in Alton
 George Rumbold (1911–1995), English professional footballer born in Alton
 Percy Andrews (1922–1985), English footballer born in Alton
 James William 'Jimmy' Dickinson (1925–1982 in Alton), an English football player 
 Cecil Andrews (1930–1986), English footballer born in Alton
 David Hughes (1930–2005), British novelist born in Alton
 Graham Stratford, English cattle breeder, local politician and in 1974 the first Town Mayor of Alton Town Council
 John Martin, Australian cricketer born in Alton
 Dave Lawson (born 1945 in Alton), English keyboardist and composer who in the 1970s was a member of UK progressive rock band Greenslade
 Maggie Holland (born 1949), English singer and songwriter born in Alton
 Spike Stent (born 1965), English record producer and mixing engineer born in Alton
 Alison Goldfrapp (born 1966), singer in Goldfrapp who went to school in Alton
 Samantha Warriner (born 1971), retired triathlete, born in Alton, who represented New Zealand
 Russell Howard (born 1980), comedian best known for Russell Howard's Good News'', studied at Alton

Twin towns

Alton is twinned with:
 Pertuis, Vaucluse, Provence-Alpes-Côte d'Azur, France
 Montecchio Maggiore, Vicenza, Veneto, Italy

Nearest places

See also
List of places of worship in East Hampshire

References

External links

 Alton Town Council
 East Hampshire District Council
 
  1929 historic film of Masonic opening of Treloar's cripples hospital

 
Towns in Hampshire
East Hampshire District